Dražen Okuka (born 5 March 1986) is a Serbian former professional footballer who played as a defender. He is the son of football manager and former player Dragan Okuka.

During his footballing career, Okuka played for one Serbian club (Čukarički) and three Hungarian clubs (Kaposvár, Diósgyőr and MTK Budapest).

References

External links

 HLSZ profile
 
 
 
 

Association football defenders
Diósgyőri VTK players
Expatriate footballers in Hungary
FK Čukarički players
Kaposvári Rákóczi FC players
MTK Budapest FC players
Nemzeti Bajnokság I players
Serbian expatriate footballers
Serbian expatriate sportspeople in Hungary
Serbian First League players
Serbian footballers
Serbian SuperLiga players
Serbs of Bosnia and Herzegovina
Sportspeople from Örebro
Swedish people of Serbian descent
1986 births
Living people